Conservative Democratic Party may refer to:

Conservative-Democratic Party
Conservative Democratic Party (Greece)
Conservative Democratic Party (Slovakia)
Conservative Democratic Party of Switzerland

See also 
Conservative Party (disambiguation)